Christ Child with a Walking Frame is a part of an altarpiece by Netherlandish artist Hieronymus Bosch, painted on the reverse of his Christ Carrying the Cross. Measuring 28 centimetres (11 inches) in diameter, it is at the Kunsthistorisches Museum (Museum of Art History), Vienna, Austria.

References

Paintings by Hieronymus Bosch
Paintings in the collection of the Kunsthistorisches Museum
1480s paintings
Paintings depicting Jesus
Paintings of children
Altarpieces